Michael Edwards (born 19 October 1968 in Farnham, Surrey) is a retired English pole vaulter. He was affiliated with the Belgrave Harriers in London.

He finished seventh at the 1987 European Junior Championships, fifth at the 1994 Commonwealth Games and sixth at the 1998 IAAF World Cup. He also competed at the 1990 European Championships, the 1991 World Championships, the 1992 Olympic Games and the 1993 World Championships without reaching the final.

His personal best jump was 5.52 metres, achieved in May 1993 in Abilene.

References
 sports-reference
 

1968 births
Living people
English male pole vaulters
Athletes (track and field) at the 1992 Summer Olympics
Olympic athletes of Great Britain
People from Farnham
Athletes (track and field) at the 1994 Commonwealth Games
Commonwealth Games competitors for England